Kabale University (KAB) is a public university in Kabale Municipality, Uganda.

Location
The coordinates of KAB are 1°16'20.0"S, 29°59'18.0"E (Latitude:-1.272215; Longitude:29.988321).

History
According to Education News Uganda, Kabale University (KAB) was established as a private institution in 2001 by stakeholders in the Kigezi sub-region. The major objective of KAB is to contribute to the socioeconomic development of Kigezi, Uganda, East Africa, Eastern Africa, and Africa through accessible training, research, and decentralized service delivery, using participatory and inclusive approaches and methodologies. KAB received accreditation from the Uganda National Council for Higher Education in 2005.

As of 2012, Kabale University wqs a Public University, fully owned and governed by the Government of the republic of Uganda. The genesis of this goes back to January 2015, after lobbying from stakeholders, the government of Uganda indicated its willingness to take over the private university, provided certain conditions were met. In June 2015, the government formally took over the university.

Academics
The university is organised into the following academic units:

 School of Medicine
 Faculty of Arts and Social Sciences
 Faculty of Computing, Library and Information Science
 Faculty of Engineering, Technology, Applied Design and Fine Art
 Faculty of Education
 Faculty of Science
Faculty of Economics and Management Sciences
Faculty of Agriculture and environmental Sciences
 Institute of Languages

Diploma programs
The diploma courses offered by the university include some of the following.

 Diploma in Computer Science
 Diploma in Information Technology
 Diploma in Education (Primary Education)
 Diploma in Education (Secondary Education)
 Diploma in Social Work and Social Administration
 Diploma in Business Administration and Management
 Diploma in Records Management
Diploma in Medical Records Management
 Diploma in Public Administration and Management
 Diploma in Health Management
 Diploma in French
 Diploma in Swahili
 Diploma in Counseling
 Postgraduate Diploma in Project Planning and Management
 Postgraduate Diploma in Human Resource Management
 Postgraduate Diploma in Public Administration and Management
 Postgraduate Diploma in Education

Undergraduate degree programs
The following are some of the undergraduate courses on offer at the university.

 Bachelor of Arts in Education
 Bachelor of Education
 Bachelor of Arts in Economics
 Bachelor of Social Work and Social Administration
 Bachelor of Business Administration
 Bachelor of Public Administration and Management
 Bachelor of Library and Information Science
 Bachelor of Computer Science
 Bachelor of Information Technology
 Bachelor of Agriculture and Land Use Management
 Bachelor of Tourism Management
 Bachelor of Environmental Sciences
 Bachelor of Science in Agriculture.
 Bachelor of Environmental Health Sciences
 Bachelor of Agribusiness
 Bachelor of Anesthesia and Critical care Medicine
 Bachelor of Building & Civil Engineering
 Bachelor of Mechanical Engineering
 Bachelor of Electrical Engineering
 Bachelor of Medicine and Bachelor of Surgery (through Kabale University School of Medicine).

Postgraduate degree programs
The following are some of the postgraduate courses that Kabale University offers.

 Master of Arts in Educational Management
 Master of Business Administration
 Master of Arts in Development Studies
 Masters in Public Administration & Management
 Master of Arts in Human Resource Management
 Master of Information Science
Master of Science in Environment and Natural Resources.
Master of Monitoring and evaluation.
Master of Public Health
Master of Educational Psychology
Master of Institutional Governance and Leadership.

Doctoral Degrees(PhDs) 
Doctor of Philosophy (PhD) in Business Administration (By Research)
Doctor of Philosophy (PhD) in Public Administration and Management (By Research)
Doctor of Philosophy (PhD) in Public Administration and Management (By Coursework and Thesis)
Doctor of Philosophy (PhD) in Business Administration (By Coursework and Research)
Doctor of Philosophy (PhD) in Education

Short Courses 

 Higher Education Bridging Certificate
 Certified Public Accountant (CPA)

See also
Education in Uganda
List of universities in Uganda
List of university leaders in Uganda
List of Business Schools in Uganda

References

External links
 Kabale University Homepage
 Kabale University - elearning
Kabale University Library
 10 Weird Facts About Kabale University Students

Kabale
 
Kigezi sub-region
Public universities
2001 establishments in Uganda
Educational institutions established in 2001
Western Region, Uganda
Engineering universities and colleges in Uganda